The 2019–20 NBL season was the 17th season for the New Zealand Breakers in the NBL.

Season summary 

For the 2019–20 season, the Breakers acquired the services of internationally respected Israeli coach Dan Shamir, replacing Kevin Braswell.  He bought with him nearly two decades of extensive experience coaching in Europe and Israel, the highlight being part of two Euroleague championship wins with Israel's Maccabi Tel Aviv. 

Shamir recruited seven new players, including US teen sensation R. J. Hampton as part of the NBL Next Stars program. The Breakers and SKY Sport agreed to a multi-year naming rights sponsorship through to 2023, along with broadcast rights for the next four years, including free to air viewing of 14 games on Prime in New Zealand.  The club also announced it would take four games around New Zealand, one each to New Plymouth and Invercargill, plus two in Christchurch after a near 15-year hiatus. The Breakers began their 2019–20 campaign with a pre-season trip to the United States with games against NBA teams the Memphis Grizzlies and Oklahoma City Thunder, losing both by double digits. 

Turmoil engulfed the early stages of the season, with their on-court woes of a 2–7 start coinciding with off-court woes. An injury to import Scotty Hopson led to the controversial signing of troubled American journeyman Glen Rice Jr., who less than two weeks after arriving in Auckland was arrested after a scuffle in a bar and subsequently suspended indefinitely by the club. Additionally, Breakers owner Matt Walsh was fined $5000 and given a two-game ban for getting into a heated argument with the NBL commissioner after a game, and forward Tom Vodanovich was met by police following a flight from Perth to Auckland in November after taking a sleeping pill in conjunction with alcohol that led to misbehaviour on the flight. The multitude of incidents led to the questioning of the club's culture, with the new ownership seemingly moving away from the family values installed under previous owners Paul and Liz Blackwell. Despite the controversy surrounding the club, the Breakers were playing to record home crowds and the 24 October encounter against the Illawarra Hawks—which saw Hampton matched-up with LaMelo Ball—was the most-watched game in NBL history with nearly two million views globally on Facebook. There were an estimated five million views on highlights from the game shared on social media platforms including Twitter, Instagram and YouTube.

A loss against the Adelaide 36ers on 24 November saw them drop to 2–8 — their worst start to a campaign since their debut in 2003–04 when they also lost eight of their first 10 games. Additionally, the team lost Corey Webster to an ankle injury. Rice was reinstated to the roster for round 10 following an investigation by Basketball Australia, but following his return match against the Taipans, he was arrested again for breaching bail conditions and was subsequently sacked by the Breakers. His release coincided with the return of Hopson from injury. After dropping to a 4–10 record, Webster left for China. A remarkable turn around occurred from round 13 onwards with the Breakers reaching 8–10 by the end of December following a four-game winning streak, and then winning 11 of their last 14 games to finish the season 15–13, only missing the playoffs on points differential. The late-season push saw the Breakers being dubbed "the team no one wants to play in the playoffs".

Roster

Depth chart

Pre-season 
The Breakers pre-season games included one regular pre-season game against the Adelaide 36ers, two games in the NBL Blitz and another two games in the NBLxNBA series, and only played a total of five games.

Standings

Game log 

|- style="background-color:#ccffcc;"
| 1
| 20 September
| Melbourne United
| W 76-97
| Corey Webster (24)
| Robert Loe (7)
| Corey Webster (5)
| Kingborough Sports Centre
| 1-0
|- style="background-color:#ffcccc;"
| 2
| 22 September
| South East Melbourne Phoenix
| L 102-95
| R. J. Hampton (20)
| R. J. Hampton, Chris Obekpa (5)
| Scotty Hopson (4)
| Derwent Entertainment Centre
| 1-1

|- style="background-color:#ffcccc;"
| 1
| 24 September
| @ Adelaide 36ers
| L 93-67
| R. J. Hampton (19)
| Rob Loe (9)
| R. J. Hampton (3)
| Titanium Security Arena
| 0-1
|- style="background-color:#ffcccc;"
| 2
| 26 September
| @ Sydney Kings
| L 81-64
| R. J. Hampton (18)
| Ethan Rusbatch (11)
| R. J. Hampton (7)
| Sydney Uni Sports & Aquatic Centre
| 0-2

|- style="background-color:#ffcccc;"
| 1
| 8 October
| @ Memphis Grizzlies
| L 108-94
| Corey Webster (19)
| Scotty Hopson (8)
| Corey Webster (8)
| FedExForum 
| 0-3
|- style="background-color:#ffcccc;"
| 2
| 10 October
| @ Oklahoma City Thunder
| L 84-110
| Rob Loe (19)
| Scotty Hopson, Ater Majok (6)
| R. J. Hampton, Sek Henry (5)
| Chesapeake Energy Arena 
| 0-4

Regular season 
The regular season of the NBL consisted of 28 games, with 10 of the Breakers' 14 home games held at Spark Arena, two held at Horncastle Arena, one at TSB Stadium and one at iLT Stadium Southland.

Standings

Game log 

|- style="background-color:#ffcccc;"
| 1
| 18 October
| @ Sydney Kings
| L 96-91
| Scotty Hopson (27)
| Thomas Abercrombie (11)
| Scotty Hopson, Corey Webster (3)
| Qudos Bank Arena 
| 0-1
|- style="background-color:#ffcccc;"
| 2
| 20 October
| Sydney Kings
| L 66-76
| Corey Webster (14)
| Brandon Ashley, Robert Loe (8)
| Scotty Hopson (4)
| Spark Arena
| 0-2
|- style="background-color:#ccffcc;"
| 3
| 24 October
| Illawarra Hawks
| W 103-72
| Sek Henry (21)
| Scotty Hopson (9)
| Corey Webster (6)
| Spark Arena
| 1-2
|- style="background-color:#ffcccc;"
| 4
| 26 October
| @ Melbourne United
| L 104-98
| Brandon Ashley (24)
| Thomas Abercrombie (8)
| Corey Webster 6
| Melbourne Arena
| 1-3
|- style="background-color:#ccffcc;"
| 5
| 31 October
| Cairns Taipans
| W 93-85
| Corey Webster (23)
| Brandon Ashley (11)
| Corey Webster (8)
| Spark Arena
| 2-3

|- style="background-color:#ffcccc;"
| 6
| 3 November
| Perth Wildcats
| L 79-84
| Brandon Ashley, Corey Webster (21)
| R. J. Hampton (7)
| Corey Webster (6)
| iLT Stadium Southland
| 2-4
|- style="background-color:#ffcccc;"
| 7
| 7 November
| Melbourne United
| L 101-104
| Glen Rice Jr. (26)
| Brandon Ashley, Corey Webster (8)
| Corey Webster (4)
| Spark Arena
| 2-5
|- style="background-color:#ffcccc;"
| 8
| 9 November
| @ South East Melbourne Phoenix
| L 103-78
| Corey Webster (22)
| Brandon Ashley (12)
| Sek Henry (8)
| Melbourne Arena
| 2-6
|- style="background-color:#ffcccc;"
| 9
| 17 November
| @ Perth Wildcats
| L 88-77
| Corey Webster (23)
| Brandon Ashley, Corey Webster (7)
| R. J. Hampton (5)
| RAC Arena
| 2-7
|- style="background-color:#ffcccc;"
| 10
| 24 November
| @ Adelaide 36ers
| L 117-100
| Sek Henry (18)
| Brandon Ashley (8)
| R. J. Hampton (6)
| Adelaide Entertainment Centre
| 2-8
|- style="background-color:#ccffcc;"
| 11
| 30 November
| Illawarra Hawks
| W 91-79
| Sek Henry (25)
| Brandon Ashley (14)
| Sek Henry (3)
| Spark Arena
| 3-8

|- style="background-color:#ffcccc;"
| 12
| 6 December
| @ Cairns Taipans
| L 108-90
| Glen Rice Jr. (30)
| Glen Rice Jr. (12)
| Glen Rice Jr. (8)
| Cairns Convention Centre
| 3-9
|- style="background-color:#ccffcc;"
| 13
| 9 December
| Brisbane Bullets
| W 96-85
| Corey Webster (23)
| Finn Delany (8)
| Finn Delany, Corey Webster (3)
| Spark Arena
| 4-9
|- style="background-color:#ffcccc;"
| 14
| 15 December
| Adelaide 36ers
| L 96-99
| Thomas Abercrombie (22)
| Thomas Abercrombie (9)
| Scotty Hopson (6)
| Spark Arena
| 4-10
|- style="background-color:#ccffcc;"
| 15
| 20 December
| South East Melbourne Phoenix
| W 90-84
| Scotty Hopson (24)
| Scotty Hopson (9)
| Sek Henry (4)
| Horncastle Arena
| 5-10
|- style="background-color:#ccffcc;"
| 16
| 22 December
| @ Illawarra Hawks
| W 89-91
| Scotty Hopson (19)
| Scotty Hopson (7)
| Sek Henry (6)
| WIN Entertainment Centre
| 6-10
|- style="background-color:#ccffcc;"
| 17
| 27 December
| @ Brisbane Bullets
| W 96-99
| Scotty Hopson (27)
| Brandon Ashley, Finn Delany (7)
| Sek Henry, Scotty Hopson (4)
| Nissan Arena
| 7-10
|- style="background-color:#ccffcc;"
| 18
| 29 December
| @ Adelaide 36ers
| W 87-96
| Scotty Hopson (31)
| Brandon Ashley (9)
| Sek Henry (8)
| Adelaide Entertainment Centre
| 8-10

|- style="background-color:#ccffcc;"
| 19
| 5 January
| @ South East Melbourne Phoenix
| W 92-97
| Thomas Abercrombie (24)
| Robert Loe (7)
| Scotty Hopson (6)
| State Basketball Centre
| 9-10
|- style="background-color:#ffcccc;"
| 20
| 9 January
| @ Cairns Taipans
| L 85-79
| Robert Loe (24)
| Abercrombie, Loe, Hopson (7)
| Hopson (8)
| Cairns Convention Centre
| 9-11
|- style="background-color:#ffcccc;"
| 21
| 12 January
| Brisbane Bullets
| L 85-95
| Thomas Abercrombie, Sek Henry (17)
| Finn Delany (6)
| Scotty Hopson (6)
| Spark Arena
| 9-12
|- style="background-color:#ccffcc;"
| 22
| 17 January
| Sydney Kings
| W 86-81
| Scotty Hopson (30)
| Finn Delany (13)
| Scotty Hopson (5)
| TSB Stadium
| 10-12
|- style="background-color:#ccffcc;"
| 23
| 19 January
| Melbourne United
| W 90-68
| Scotty Hopson (22)
| Finn Delany (10)
| Thomas Abercrombie (5)
| Spark Arena
| 11-12
|- style="background-color:#ffcccc;"
| 24
| 25 January
| @ Perth Wildcats
| L 90-89
| Brandon Ashley (21)
| Brandon Ashley (11)
| Scotty Hopson, Jarrad Weeks (5)
| RAC Arena
| 11-13
|- style="background-color:#ccffcc;"
| 25
| 31 January
| Adelaide 36ers
| W 113-89
| Thomas Abercrombie (31)
| Finn Delany (10)
| Sek Henry (8)
| Spark Arena
| 12-13

|- style="background-color:#ccffcc;"
| 26
| 2 February
| @ Illawarra Hawks
| W 56-65
| Sek Henry (17)
| Finn Delany (6)
| Scotty Hopson (9)
| WIN Entertainment Centre
| 13-13
|- style="background-color:#ccffcc;"
| 27
| 7 February
| @ Brisbane Bullets
| W 87-91
| Scotty Hopson (31)
| Finn Delany (12)
| Sek Henry (5)
| Nissan Arena 
| 14-13
|- style="background-color:#ccffcc;"
| 28
| 14 February
| South East Melbourne Phoenix
| W 92-83
| Scotty Hopson (23)
| Abercrombie, Ashley, Loe, Hopson (5)
| Scotty Hopson (10)
| Spark Arena
| 15-13

Awards

Player of the Week 
Round 12, Scotty Hopson

Round 16, Scotty Hopson

See also 

 2019–20 NBL season
 New Zealand Breakers

References

External links 

 Official Website

New Zealand Breakers season
New Zealand Breakers season
New Zealand Breakers seasons
New Zealand Breakers